Perrine may refer to:

Places
 Perrine, Florida, an unincorporated community
 Perrine Bridge, Twin Falls, Idaho, United States; named after I. B. Perrine
 Perrine's Bridge, near Rifton, New York, United States
 Perrine (crater), an impact crater on the Moon

Other uses
 Perrine (name), a list of people and fictional characters with the surname or given name
 Perrine, a restaurant at The Pierre hotel, New York City

See also
 Perine (disambiguation)